Alternating custody can have two different meanings. It is typically used when parents take turns having sole custody of a child based on a regular schedule, while the non-custodial parent has visitation rights. For example, the father may have sole custody on odd years while mother has sole custody on even years. Also called divided custody, this is a very rare type of child custody, typically utilized when the parents of a child live long distances away from each other.

At other times, the term is used as a synonym for divided custody, a form of joint physical custody where the child lives approximately equal time with the two parent, for example with weekly or bi-weekly exchanges.

See also
Divorce
Child custody
Parenting plan
Shared parenting

References

Child custody
Juvenile law
Relationship breakup
Fathers' rights
Mothers' rights